Ahmet Haliti (born 29 September 1988) is a Kosovo Albanian professional footballer who plays as a defender for Kosovan club Prishtina.

Club career

Besa Kavajë
On 18 January 2014, Haliti signed to Albanian Superliga side Besa Kavajë. On 1 February 2014, he made his debut in a 2–2 home draw against Laçi after being named in the starting line-up.

Bylis Ballsh
On 13 August 2015, Haliti signed to Albanian Superliga side Bylis Ballsh. On 23 August 2015, he made his debut in a 2–0 away defeat against Kukësi after being named in the starting line-up.

Feronikeli
On 27 May 2016, Haliti signed to Football Superleague of Kosovo side Feronikeli.

Return to Prishtina
On 28 May 2018, Haliti returned to Football Superleague of Kosovo club Prishtina after playing for Feronikeli for three years, where he signed a one year contract with the club.

International career
On 22 January 2018. Haliti received a call-up from Kosovo for the friendly match against Azerbaijan. The match however was cancelled two days later, which prolonged his debut.

References

External links

1988 births
Living people
Sportspeople from Podujevo
Kosovo Albanians
Association football defenders
Kosovan footballers
Football Superleague of Kosovo players
KF Hysi players
FC Prishtina players
KF Feronikeli players
Kategoria Superiore players
Besa Kavajë players
KF Bylis Ballsh players
Kosovan expatriate footballers
Expatriate footballers in Albania
Kosovan expatriate sportspeople in Albania